Llannefydd (sometimes ) is a village and community in Conwy County Borough, in Wales. In the 2011 census the community parish had a population of 590. The community includes the village of Cefn Berain and part of the hamlet of Bont Newydd.

Saint Nefydd and Saint Mary's church, founded in the fifth century, is Grade I listed; the farms of Berain and Plas Uchaf are Grade II* listed, with Plas Uchaf's gardens being listed at Grade II on the Cadw/ICOMOS Register of Parks and Gardens of Special Historic Interest in Wales. Numerous agricultural buildings in the community, along with a number of bridges over the two rivers, are Grade II listed.  In 1978, archaeological excavations in a cave at Bont-newydd, in the east of the community, unearthed the teeth and jawbone of an 11-year-old Neanderthal boy dating from 230,000 years ago, the oldest human remains discovered in Wales.

Thomas Edwards, better known as the Welsh language dramatist and poet Twm o'r Nant, was born in Llannefydd in 1738, but fled to Llandeilo to avoid imprisonment for his uncle's debts, for which he had stood surety.  His anterliwtau, satirical musical plays, lambasted tax collectors, landlords, lawyers and the religious hypocrisy of the established church, and promoted Methodism.

Nearby is the hill Mynydd y Gaer which has a hillfort and is 280 metres (919 feet) with views stretching to Snowdonia, the Clwydian Range and Mynydd Hiraethog.

References

External links 

 A Vision of Britain Through Time
 British Listed Buildings
 Clwyd Churches
 Eastern Conwy Churches Survey
 Genuki
 Geograph
 Office for National Statistics
 www.hill-bagging.co.uk : Mynydd y Gaer

Villages in Conwy County Borough
Communities in Conwy County Borough
Listed buildings in Conwy County Borough
Registered historic parks and gardens in Conwy County Borough